This is a list of Members of Parliament (MPs) elected at the January 1910 general election, held over several days from 15 January to 10 February 1910.

By-elections
See the list of United Kingdom by-elections.

References

See also
January 1910 United Kingdom general election
List of parliaments of the United Kingdom

1910 01
January 1910 United Kingdom general election
 List
UK MPs